Alex Boncayao Brigade is a 1989 action film directed by Joey del Rosario. The film stars Ronnie Ricketts, Mia Prats, George Estregan Jr., Richard Bonnin and Marco Polo, alongside Dave Brodett, Val Iglesias, Nick Romano, Bomber Moran, and Dexter Doria. It is about the titular communist militant group (otherwise known as the Sparrow Unit) that functions as the urban guerrilla unit of the New People's Army. Produced by Olympia Pictures, the film was released on January 18, 1989.

Critic Lav Diaz expressed that the film was "nothing extraordinary".

Cast

Ronnie Ricketts as Romy
Mia Prats as Dolores
George Estregan Jr. as Rudy
Richard Bonnin as Leo
Marco Polo as Ricky
Dave Brodett as Lt. Cordero
Lucita Soriano as Ka Rosa
Nick Romano as Roberto
Bomber Moran as Slim
Dexter Doria as Fe
Emil Estrada as Pfc. Salcedo
Eddie del Mar Jr. as Pfc. Abad
Val Iglesias as Sgt. Padilla
Philip Gamboa as Col. Ramos
Zandro Zamora as Col. Espiritu
Rodolfo 'Boy' Garcia as Maj. Francisco
Vic Varrion as Col. Medina
Dante Abadeza as Carding
Maylene Gonzales as Celina
Nello Nayo as 	Atty. Juan Sevilla
Rene Hawkins as Itoy
Cris Daluz as Cristino
Eddie Tuazon as Patis
Becky Misa	 as Mrs. Gonzales

Release
Alex Boncayao Brigade was released on January 18, 1989.

Critical response
Lav Diaz, writing for the Manila Standard, considered the film to be "nothing extraordinary", with a standard "Ka" (communist) story and ordinary, albeit numerous, action scenes. He criticized, however, the "corny" speech towards the end of the film.

See also
Other depictions of the Alex Boncayao Brigade (Sparrow Unit) in film:
Target: Sparrow Unit (1987) - also written by Tony Calvento and starring Ronnie Ricketts
Ambush (1988) - also starring Ronnie Ricketts
Patrolman (1988)

References

External links

1989 films
1989 action films
Filipino-language films
Films about communism
Films about rebels
Philippine action films
Films directed by Joey del Rosario